Schools of the Sacred Heart is a complex of two Catholic single-sex private schools for grades Pre-Kindergarten-3 through grade 12 in Grand Coteau, Louisiana.

The Academy of the Sacred Heart, founded in 1821, is the girls' school, with residential accommodations for students in grades 9 through 12. It is operated independently within the Diocese of Lafayette. Its brother school is Berchmans Academy for boys, founded in 2006.

History 
The Academy was established in 1821 and is the second oldest institution of learning west of the Mississippi. It is the oldest, continually running member of the Network of Sacred Heart Schools in the world. It is also the oldest independent school in the Acadiana region.

Founded under the direction of Saint Philippine Duchesne, the Academy has remained in continuous operation through fire, epidemics, and war. Although thousands of Federal troops were encamped in the fields surrounding the Academy during the Civil War, the school was not touched. Union General Nathaniel Banks had a daughter in a school in New York run by the Religious of the Sacred Heart, and he was asked to look after the Grand Coteau sisters and their students.

On campus is a small chapel honoring St. John Berchmans, a Jesuit. St. John Berchmans appeared to a novice, Mary Wilson and cured her of a fatal illness. This miracle eventually led to the canonization of John Berchmans. It is the only shrine at the exact location of a confirmed miracle in the United States.

Accreditation and memberships
The Academy is accredited by the Louisiana State Department of Education Independent Schools Association of the Southwest (ISAS) and AdvencED.  ISAS is a voluntary membership association of private schools. The Association was founded in 1955 and incorporated not-for-profit in 1970. The membership of ISAS consists of 81 schools located in Arizona, Kansas, Louisiana, Mexico, New Mexico, Oklahoma and Texas enrolling over 44,000 students.

The Academy of the Sacred Heart is member of the National Association of Independent Schools (NAIS) and the Network of Sacred Heart Schools.  The network consists of twenty-one educational institutions in the United States and over two hundred schools internationally.  All of the network schools are rooted in the philosophy and vision of St. Madeline Sophie and are guided by the Goals and Criteria of Sacred Heart Education.

The Academy is also a member of the National Catholic Education Association.

Goals and Criteria 
As a member of the Network of Sacred Heart Schools, the Academy commits itself to educate to the following 5 goals:

•	a personal and active faith in God

•	a deep respect for intellectual values

•	a social awareness which impels to action

•	the building of community as a Christian value

•	personal growth in an atmosphere of wise freedom

Curriculum 
The Academy offers a strong, diversified curriculum. Lower School students (grades Pre-K3 through 7th) study art studio, music, guidance, and art appreciation in addition to the more traditional subjects.

The Lower School is divided into Primary (grades Pre-K3 through 4th) and Prep (grades 5th through 7th).

Upper School (grades 8 through 12) students participate in a wide variety of extracurricular activities including athletics, student community governance, performance art, clubs and community service.

Private music lessons are available.

The Academy also hosts many international students (including Foreign Exchange students) in its boarding facilities and has an English as a Second Language Program.

Equestrian program 
The Academy has an equestrian program with a barn available for students wishing to bring their own horses. 
The Academy is home to over thirty school-owned and privately owned horses. Sacred Heart Stables, center for the SSH equestrian studies division, features a fourteen stall barn in addition to the unique six stall barn that was built in 1886.

Facts 
After Hurricane Katrina, it hosted the satellite location for Academy of the Sacred Heart of the Rosary in New Orleans, and its students housed many of the dislocated students from New Orleans.

In 2006, it opened a boys division, Berchmans Academy, for boys in grades PK3-2nd grade. Berchmans Academy currently accommodates boys in PK3 - 12th grade.

In 2006, the administration decided to rename the institution that runs both the Academy of the Sacred Heart and Berchmans Academy. The new name is Schools of the Sacred Heart, Grand Coteau.

In 2006, Headmistress Mary Burns announced her retirement at the conclusion of the 2006-2007 school year. She was temporarily succeeded by Sister Claude DeMoustier, who was then succeeded by Sister Lynne Lieux in 2008.

In 2016, Dr. Yvonne Sandoz Adler, Ph.D. became the new Head of School.

Notable alumni 
Lucille May Grace (Class of 1919), Louisiana Register of the State Lands, 1931-1952; 1956-1957
Salma Hayek, actress
Dawson Lanclos, US Special Forces

References

External links 

Girls' schools in Louisiana
Private K-12 schools in Louisiana
Educational institutions established in 1821
Catholic secondary schools in Louisiana
Catholic elementary schools in Louisiana
Catholic boarding schools in the United States
Sacred Heart schools in the United States
Schools in St. Landry Parish, Louisiana
Boarding schools in Louisiana
Independent Schools Association of the Southwest
Grand Coteau, Louisiana
1821 establishments in Louisiana